SS Santa Rosa (later SS Athinai) was a passenger and cargo ocean liner built for the Grace Line for operation by its subsidiary Panama Mail Steamship Company of San Francisco. All four ships, dubbed "The Four Sisters" and "The Big Four" were noted as the finest serving the West Coast and were of advanced technology. All served in World War II as War Shipping Administration (WSA) troop ships. Both Santa Lucia and Santa Elena were lost in air and torpedo attacks off North Africa.

The ship was ordered in 1930 from the Federal Shipbuilding and Drydock Company of Kearny, New Jersey. Her regular route included inter-coastal service between the east coast and the west coast of the US via the Caribbean and the Panama Canal.  She was the second of ultimately three vessels to bear the name Santa Rosa for the Grace Line. (The first Santa Rosa was a 1917-built ship that was sold in 1925.)

Design and construction
Grace ordered four new ships to comply with its mail contracts. The design of the four ships was by Gibbs & Cox, Inc., founded by William Francis Gibbs, with consultants for joiner work John Russell Pope and interior design by Dorothy Marckwald who formed the firm Elsie Cobb Wilson. At the time women taking a lead in interior design for ships was "unheard of" and U.S. ship interiors were based on 18th century English styles with many Americans dubious about "modern" styles.

The public rooms were all on the promenade deck. The dining room was located on this deck between the two funnels and had an atrium stretching up two and a half decks. Unique for its day was a retractable roof which allowed the passenger to dine under the tropical sky. The Grace Line also employed female waitresses instead of male stewards. All first class cabins were outside twin beds and private baths.

The ship's keel was laid with yard number 121 on 22 June 1931. Launch was on 24 March 1932 and delivery to Grace Line's subsidiary Panama Mail Steamship Company on 27 October 1932.

Prewar Grace Line service
The Santa Rosa sailed on her maiden voyage on 26 November 1932. Her East-West coast route of New York-Seattle was 20 days and included a one-day call in Los Angeles and two days in San Francisco. The ship's service speed of 20 knots and her superior accommodation made her very popular compared to that offered by Pacific Coast shipping. In 1936 however the intercoastal service ended and Santa Rosa and her sisters transferred to service to the Caribbean.

World War II service
Santa Rosa was requisitioned by the US War Shipping Administration on 3 January 1942 with Grace Line operating the ship as agents and allocated to Army for troop service. Santa Rosa had a capacity of 2,426 troops. Even in wartime gray, the ship retained her elegant oceanliner lines:

...Further down and across the dock, the Grace Line passenger ship SS Santa Rosa, also lay waiting. She was painted wartime gray but she still flaunted her nubile twin funnels, sweeping bow and long, beautiful lines; She exuded an aura of speed, luxury, and moonlight tropical nights. The SS Santa Rosa was sexier than Rita Hayworth in a travel poster...

Santa Rosa made 21 voyages from the east coast of the US from 1942-1945: one to Europe, one to Australia, one to India, and three to Africa.

Her wartime voyages included:
 January 1942 - New York to Melbourne and Nouméa via the Panama Canal
 April 1942 - Suez, Massaua, Adan, Durban
 November 1942 - to the Clyde
 November 1942 - to Casablanca
 January 1943 - to Casablanca
 February 1943 - Bermuda and Casablanca
 April 1943 - Casablanca, Gibraltar, the Clyde, Algiers, and Phillippeville
 August 1943 - Oran in Algeria
 October 1943 - Boston to Swansea, the Clyde, Palermo, Newport UK
 December 1943 - via Boston to Bristol and Newport
 February 1944 - Belfast
 March 1944 - from Boston to Avonmouth and Cardiff
 May 1944 - via Norfolk to Naples and Gibraltar
 July 1944 - via Norfolk to Oran, Naples, and Cape Henry
 August 1944 - Assigned to Task Force 85.3.2, Transport Group, Section II for Operation Dragoon, the 15 August 1944 invasion of southern France.
 October 1944 - Marseilles, Oran, and Gibraltar
 December 1944 - from Boston to Swansea and return to Boston
 January 1945 - Le Havre and Southampton
 February 1945 - to La Harve and Plymouth
 March 1945 - to The Solent, Le Havre, Southampton
 June 1945 - Southampton
 July 1945 - Le Havre and Cherbourg with return to Hampton Roads, to Plymouth and Le Havre
 August 1945 - Le Havre and Cherbourg with return to Hampton Roads, to Plymouth and Le Havre
 September 1945 - Marseilles
 October 1945 - from New York via Port Said to Karachi
 December 1945 - from New York via Port Said to Karachi with return to New York in January 1946

The vessel was returned to Grace Line on 3 February 1947. Two sisters, Santa Lucia and Santa Elena, were lost during war service. Santa Lucia was under sub-bareboat charter from WSA by the U.S. Navy operating as USS Leedstown east of Algiers when attacked by German aircraft on 8 November 1942. Santa Elena was torpedoed and sunk on 6 November 1943 off Skikda, Algeria.

Postwar Grace Line service
After her war service she underwent repair and refit at the Newport News Shipbuilding & Drydock Company prior to redelivery to her owners. Santa Rosa returned to Grace Line and resumed the Caribbean service on 7 February 1947. In 1958, after 26 years of service, Santa Rosa was replaced by a larger liner of the same name. In June 1958 Santa Rosa was renamed Santa Paula. The older ship was laid up at Hoboken, NJ until 1961 when she was sold to Greek owners.

Typaldos Lines service

Santa Rosa was renamed Athinai and began a new career as a cruise ship for Typaldos Lines. A refit increased her accommodation and converted her to carry three classes of passengers. She entered service for her new owners for voyages in the Mediterranean, Black Sea and Adriatic. Athinai in her Typaldos Line livery appears briefly in a scene of the port of Piraeus, Greece, in the 1963 film The Bullfighter Advances. In 1968 the Typaldos Lines owners were arrested and the company disbanded after the Greek government investigation of the  incident found them guilty of manslaughter and negligence. The company's ships were taken over and sold except for two, including SS Athinai, who attracted no buyers and were subsequently laid up in initially at Kynosoura and later Eleusis Bay, West of Athens.

1968–89
Santa Rosa/Athinai never returned to active service.

Raise the Titanic 
In 1978 she was towed out of layup for use as a film set for Raise the Titanic.  After a decade of neglect, and with fittings that did not appear to be out of place on a 1912 built ship, Athinai needed very little conversion work for filming the Titanic's interiors. Her bows were painted to resemble Titanic and she was sprayed with green foam to simulate 68 years on the ocean floor. After the filming she was returned to Eleusis Bay.

Lay-up & Scrapping 
She remained for another ten years until 1989, when she was towed for scrapping at Aliağa, Turkey in a purge of derelict shipping.

Footnotes

References 

1932 ships
Passenger ships of the United States
Ships built in Kearny, New Jersey
Steamships of the United States
Steam turbine-powered ships
Troop ships of the War Shipping Administration